Cheng Hui may refer to:
 Cheng Hui (field hockey)
 Cheng Hui (footballer)